Andriy Kikot (born 17 June 1984) is a retired Ukrainian football player and former manager of Rukh Vynnyky.

References

External links 

 Profile on Official Website

1984 births
Living people
Sportspeople from Lviv
Ukrainian footballers
FC Karpaty Lviv players
FC Karpaty-2 Lviv players
FC Enerhetyk Burshtyn players
FC Helios Kharkiv players
FC Arsenal-Kyivshchyna Bila Tserkva players
FC Naftovyk-Ukrnafta Okhtyrka players
FC Lviv players
FC Nyva Ternopil players
FC Rukh Lviv players
Ukrainian football managers
FC Rukh Lviv managers
Association football midfielders